Jadine is a female given name and can refer to:

Jadine Childs, protagonist of Toni Morrison's Tar Baby (novel)
Jadine Nollan, member of the Oklahoma House of Representatives
JaDine, portmanteau of the Filipino love team James Reid and Nadine Lustre

See also
Jade